General elections were held in Oman for the first time in 1991.

Background
Sultan Qaboos announced the creation of the Consultative Assembly to replace the State Consultative Council in a speech on National Day in November 1990.

Electoral system
The 60-member Consultative Assembly consisted of 59 district representatives and a Chairman. It was initially announced that each of the 59 electoral districts, based on the country's , would nominate three candidates, and it was assumed that the candidates would then face direct elections. In April 1991 provincial committees started producing lists of candidates by secret ballot. The provincial committees were between 400 and 500 people in size and consisted of people with "valued opinion and experience". They were appointed by local governors and restricted to dignitaries, tribal leaders and some graduates, all of whom had to be invited to vote by local governors. Women could be selected to join the committees but were not allowed to stand as candidates.

Candidates were required to be at least 30 years old, not have an unpardoned conviction for an "offence of dishonesty" and be of "high esteem [and] good reputation".

Results
Although elections had been expected, a royal decree in November resulted in the candidate lists being reviewed by Deputy Prime Minister for Legal Affairs Sayyid Fahd bin Mahmud. Bin Mahmud then made a recommendation for which candidate to join the Consultative Assembly to Qaboos to ratify.

Members

Aftermath
Abdullah bin Ali al-Qatabi, the former President of the State Consultative Council, was appointed Chairman of the new Consultative Assembly in November 1991. The Assembly subsequently elected two deputy chairmen at its first ordinary meeting in January 1992; Salim bin Hilal al-Khalili and Aflah bin Hamad bin Salim al-Rawahi.

References

1991 elections in Asia
1991
Election
Non-partisan elections